Surgut Power Station may refer to:

Surgut-1 Power Station
Surgut-2 Power Station